This is a list of notable synagogues in Russia.

Moscow 
Bolshaya Bronnaya Synagogue
Holocaust Memorial Synagogue (Moscow)
Maryina Roshcha Synagogue (Moscow)
Moscow Choral Synagogue

Saint Petersburg 

Grand Choral Synagogue

Jewish Autonomous Oblast 
Beit T'shuva, Birobidzhan, Jewish Autonomous Oblast
Birobidzhan Synagogue, Birobidzhan, Jewish Autonomous Oblast

Kaliningrad Oblast

 Königsberg Synagogue, Kaliningrad Oblast

Kemerovo Oblast 

 Mariinsk Synagogue, Mariinsk

Nizhny Novgorod Oblast 
Nizhny Novgorod Synagogue, Nizhny Novgorod

Republic of Dagestan 

Derbent Synagogue, Derbent

Rostov Oblast 
Main Choral Synagogue, Rostov-on-Don, Rostov Oblast
Soldier Synagogue, Rostov-on-Don, Rostov Oblast
The Artisans' Synagogue, Rostov-on-Don, Rostov Oblast

Samara Oblast 
Samara Choral Synagogue, Samara Oblast

Smolensk Oblast 
Choral Synagogue (Smolensk), Smolensk Oblast

Sverdlovsk Oblast 
Yekaterinburg Synagogue, Sverdlovsk Oblast

Tomsk Oblast 
Tomsk Choral Synagogue, Tomsk Oblast

Volgograd Oblast 
Volgograd Synagogue, Volgograd Oblast

Voronezh Oblast 
Voronezh Synagogue, Voronezh Oblast

References

 
Russia
Synagogues